Bernd Winter (born 24 July 1971) is a retired German football midfielder.

References

1971 births
Living people
German footballers
Viktoria Aschaffenburg players
Fortuna Düsseldorf players
VfL Wolfsburg players
SV Meppen players
SC Preußen Münster players
1. FC Schweinfurt 05 players
FSV Frankfurt players
2. Bundesliga players
Association football midfielders
People from Groß-Umstadt
Sportspeople from Darmstadt (region)
Footballers from Hesse